DZCA (1170 AM) was a radio station owned and operated by the Office of Civil Defense.

It served as the official radio station of the Philippine Atmospheric Geophysical and Astronomical Services Administration or (PAGASA), wherein it aired the latest weather information in the country at the top of the hour.

The station went off the air in 1993 due to lack of funding. Despite being inactive, the frequency receives live broadcast of Voice of America via DWVA in La Union.

References

Defunct radio stations in Metro Manila
News and talk radio stations in the Philippines
Radio stations established in 1960
Radio stations disestablished in 1993